Kyösti Järvinen (31 March 1869, Jyväskylä - 31 March 1957) was a Finnish social scientist, politician and Professor of political science at the Helsinki School of Economics.

Järvinen was the first Dean of the Helsinki School of Economics and served from 1911 to 1919, and Professor of political science from 1922 to 1939. He was a member of parliament from 1922 to 1930, and served as Minister of Trade and Industry in the Mantere Cabinet (22 December 1928 - 16 August 1929), and Minister of Finance from December 1925 to December 1926 and from March 1931 to December 1932.

Selected publications 
 Järvinen, Kyösti Nestor. Der Zahlungsverkehr im Aussenhandel Finnlands vor der Ausbildung des einheimischen Bankwesens: ein Beitrag zur Entwicklungsgeschichte des internationalen Zahlungswesens. Vol. 30. G. Fischer, 1921.

References 

1869 births
1957 deaths
People from Jyväskylä
People from Vaasa Province (Grand Duchy of Finland)
National Coalition Party politicians
Ministers of Finance of Finland
Ministers of Trade and Industry of Finland
Members of the Parliament of Finland (1922–24)
Members of the Parliament of Finland (1924–27)
Members of the Parliament of Finland (1927–29)
Members of the Parliament of Finland (1929–30)
Finnish business theorists
20th-century Finnish economists
Academic staff of Aalto University
19th-century Finnish economists